Gentisic acid is a dihydroxybenzoic acid. It is a derivative of benzoic acid and a minor (1%) product of the metabolic break down of aspirin, excreted by the kidneys.

It is also found in the African tree Alchornea cordifolia and in wine.

Production 
Gentisic acid is produced by carboxylation of hydroquinone.
C6H4(OH)2 + CO2 → C6H3(CO2H)(OH)2
This conversion is an example of a Kolbe–Schmitt reaction.

Alternatively the compound can be synthesized from salicylic acid via Elbs persulfate oxidation.

Reactions
In the presence of the enzyme gentisate 1,2-dioxygenase, gentisic acid reacts with oxygen to give maleylpyruvate:
2,5-dihydroxybenzoate + O2  maleylpyruvate

Applications 
As a hydroquinone, gentisic acid is readily oxidised and is used as an antioxidant excipient in some pharmaceutical preparations.

In the laboratory, it is used as a sample matrix in matrix-assisted laser desorption/ionization (MALDI) mass spectrometry, and has been shown to conveniently detect peptides incorporating the boronic acid moiety by MALDI.

References 

Hydroquinones
Salicylic acids
Dihydroxybenzoic acids
Phenolic human metabolites
Human drug metabolites